Wittenbeck is a municipality  in the Rostock district, in Mecklenburg-Vorpommern, Germany.

Gallery

References

External links 

wittenbeck.com - Official website of the municipality (German)